Rolf Bossi (10 September 1923 – 22 December 2015) was a German criminal defense lawyer. He was known for defending prominent actors such as Ingrid van Bergen and Romy Schneider, as well as criminals such as Jürgen Bartsch, Dieter Zlof, and Dieter Degowski. He defended four former East German border guards who were accused of having killed Chris Gueffroy, who was trying to escape over the Berlin wall. He was considered to be one of Germany's best-known defense lawyers. He wrote an autobiography, appeared in talk shows and even had two film roles.

References

1923 births
2015 deaths
People from Munich
20th-century German lawyers
Jurists from Bavaria